Jürgen Heun (born 26 May 1958) is a retired football forward.

During his club career, Heun played for FC Rot-Weiß Erfurt. He played 17 times for the East Germany national team, scoring 4 goals.

External links
 
 

1958 births
Living people
East German footballers
East Germany international footballers
Association football forwards
FC Rot-Weiß Erfurt players
DDR-Oberliga players
People from Gotha (district)
Footballers from Thuringia